Friedrich Jörg "Fritz" Hollaus (21 October 1929 – February 1994) was an Austrian footballer who played in Austria for SC Rapid Oberlaa, Wiener Sportclub and SV Stadlau, and in Spain for Atlético Madrid and Real Mallorca.

External links 
 
 

1929 births
1994 deaths
Footballers from Vienna
Austrian footballers
Austrian expatriate footballers
Austrian expatriate sportspeople in Spain
Association football defenders
Association football forwards
Wiener Sport-Club players
Atlético Madrid footballers
RCD Mallorca players
La Liga players
Expatriate footballers in Spain